Lawa or Lawas may refer to:
 Lawa people, an ethnic group of Laos and northern Thailand
 Lawa language, spoken by the Lawa people
 Los Angeles World Airports, the commission for airports in Los Angeles, United States

Rivers
 Lawa River (Africa), a river in West Africa, flowing through Guinea and Liberia
 Lawa River (Indonesia), a river in southeastern Borneo
 Lawa River (South America), a river in the Guyanas region of South America

Places
 Lawa Thikana, a former princely state of India
 Lawa, Punjab, a town in Punjab province, Pakistan
 Lawas, capital town of Lawas District, Sarawak, Malaysia
 Lawa, Philippines, a town in Obando, Bulacan